Monroe Township may refer to one of the following places in the State of Iowa:

 Monroe Township, Benton County, Iowa
 Monroe Township, Butler County, Iowa
 Monroe Township, Fremont County, Iowa
 Monroe Township, Johnson County, Iowa
 Monroe Township, Linn County, Iowa
 Monroe Township, Madison County, Iowa
 Monroe Township, Mahaska County, Iowa
 Monroe Township, Monroe County, Iowa
 Monroe Township, Ringgold County, Iowa
 Monroe Township, Shelby County, Iowa
 Monroe Township, Wayne County, Iowa

See also

Monroe Township (disambiguation)

Iowa township disambiguation pages